Guido Maggiorino Gatti (1892–1973) was an Italian music critic and the founder of the journal Il Pianoforte, which changed its name to La Rassegna Musicale  in 1928.

He was director of the Turin Theater from 1925 to 1931 and general director of the first Maggio Musicale Fiorentino. Contributor to several Italian musical encyclopedias and other reference works, he also produced monographs of Bizet (1915) and Pizzetti (1934). His fifty-eight-year correspondence with Malipiero has been published.

He was a contributor to the Grove Dictionary of Music and Musicians (under the initials G.M.G.), 1954 (fifth) edition.

His wife was noted harpist Clelia Gatti Aldrovandi.

Italian music critics
1892 births
1973 deaths